Rivera HVDC Back-to-back station is the first HVDC Back-to-back station situated south of Rivera, Uruguay at . It was built by Areva and inaugurated in 2000. Rivera HVDC Back-to-back station whose function is to perform a conversion of 50 Hz power from the power grid of Uruguay into 60 Hz for the power grid of Brazil, operates with a DC voltage of 20 kV. The transmission rate is 70 MW.
As this interconnection does not fit today's requirement, a second interconnection over Melo HVDC Back-to-back station was built.

See also

 Back-to-back connection

External links 
 AREVA T&D - Power Electronics – HVDC & FACTS (MsPowerPoint)

Electric power infrastructure in Uruguay
Electric power infrastructure in Brazil
Rivera Department